Shambhu Prasad Dhungel (born 1885 – 1929) was a Nepali author, playwright, and poet.

Biography 
Shambhu Prasad Dhungel was born in 1885 in Kathmandu, Nepal. Born into a well-to-do family, Dhungel spent his childhood years in comfort. At the age of 15, he wrote Panchak Prapancha. He later published books in Banaras with Punyaprasad Parkashan.

He was referred to as Ashu Kavi (lit. "spontaneous poet") by Chandra Shumsher Jang Bahadur Rana. Dhungel mostly based his works in Sanskrit plays. Dhungel wrote about fifteen plays, but only six have survived.

In 1962, the Government of Nepal issued postage stamps featuring Dhungel.

In 2003, D. B. Gurung said Dhungel was "a rare poetic genius".

Works 

 Ratnavali
 Krishna Charitra (1921)
 Hitopadesha (1923)
 Dhruva Charitra (1924)
 Mahabharata (1924)
 Shree Ādikavi Bhānu Bhaktācāryako Jivan – Caritra

References 

1885 births
1929 deaths
19th-century Nepalese poets
20th-century Nepalese educators
20th-century Nepalese poets
Nepalese dramatists and playwrights
Nepalese educators
Nepalese male poets
Nepali-language writers
People from Kathmandu District
Translators to Nepali